Parras de la Fuente is a city located in the southern part of the Mexican state of Coahuila. The city serves as the municipal seat of the surrounding Parras Municipality, which has an area of 9,271.7 km2 (3,579.8 sq mi).

At the census of 2010, the population was 45,423. There are many factories that produce denim, including a Dickies factory, and Parras is also a source for Mexican wine. It was the first wine growing region in the Americas.

History
The former Hacienda del Rosario is the place where Parras de la Fuente was founded in 1598, by Capitán Antón Martín de Zapata. The revolutionary and President of Mexico Francisco I. Madero was born in 1873.

In 1846, during the Mexican–American War, Parras was held by American troops. Additionally, French forces were defeated there in 1866 during the French intervention in Mexico.

The oldest winery in the Americas is in Parras de la Fuente, and was founded by Lorenzo García on August 19, 1597. Casa Madero is home to the oldest winery.

Features
Parras de la Fuente is a Pueblo Mágico, designated in 2004. Parras is called the oasis of the semi-desert of Coahuila state. It has bathing resorts (which were used to generate electric power for industry usage).

The Municipality President's building, a historical attraction, is a replica of the State's Government Palace in Saltillo. The Hostal el Farol is the historic former house of General Raúl Madero. San Ignacio de Loyola church was built in the 17th century. Santo Madero church is located on an extinct volcano plug just north of the town.

Notable residents
Senator Francisco José Madero González, who was interim Governor of Coahuila from August 12, 1981, to November 30, 1981.

Sister city
 Grapevine, Texas, USA

Academic programs
 Parras Summer Program, in Spanish language and culture and appropriate technology; a program of Humboldt State University in Arcata, California

See also
Pueblo Mágico

References

Link to tables of population data from the Census of 2005 INEGI: Instituto Nacional de Estadística, Geografía e Informática
Coahuila Enciclopedia de los Municipios de México

External links

Populated places in Coahuila
Pueblos Mágicos
Populated places established in 1598
1598 establishments in New Spain